Walter Engelmann may refer to:

 Walter Engelmann (gymnast), gymnast who represented Germany at the 1912 Summer Olympics
 Walter Engelmann, fictional character in the opera Frau Margot